The Jewish Museum in Prague (Czech: Židovské muzeum v Praze) is a museum of Jewish heritage in the Czech Republic and one of the most visited museums in Prague. Its collection of Judaica is one of the largest in the world, about 40,000 objects, 100,000 books, and a copious archive of Czech Jewish community histories.

History

Foundation and development (1906–1939) 
The Jewish Museum in Prague was founded in 1906 by historian Dr. Hugo Lieben (1881–1942) and Dr. Augustin Stein (1854–1937), who later became the head of the Prague Jewish Community. Its purpose was to document history and customs of the Jewish population of the Czech lands, as well as to preserve artifacts from Prague synagogues demolished in an urban renewal campaign at the beginning of the 20th century.

During Nazi occupation (1939–1945) 
When the Nazis instituted the Protectorate of Bohemia and Moravia in part of the former Czechoslovakia, the museum became the Central Bureau for Jewish Emigration. (Its name was later changed to the Central Bureau for Arrangement of the Jewish Question in Bohemia and Moravia.) Karel Stein (1906–1961), an employee of the Jewish community in Prague, suggested that properties of the community be stored in the museum and supervised the preservation. These properties were considered valuable works of art by Nazis and therefore acceptable for preservation. Because of the initiative of the Jewish community, many objects were collected, and the Museum was professionally led by Josef Polák.

After the war (1945–1994) 
Around 80 000 Czech Jews fell victim to the Second World War and so afterwards there was almost nobody to claim the confiscated objects, preserved in the Museum. Endowed with a new vocation, ensuing from the historical fact of the Holocaust, the Museum re-established its activity on 13 May 1945, under the administration of Jewish Religious Communities Council and under the leadership of Hana Volavková. Its first exhibition after the War took place on 26 June 1945. Among the personalities who worked here were the poet and scholar H. G. Adler who rescued many priceless documents from the Theresienstadt Ghetto for the Museum.

On 25 February 1948, after less than three years of post-war freedom, the Communists staged a coup d'état and took over the government of Czechoslovakia. Out of the Communist regime's initiative, the Jewish Museum became state property on 4 April 1950 and its name was changed respectively to the State Jewish Museum. During the Communist dictatorship, until its fall in November 1989, the raison d’être of the Museum was constantly disputed on ideological grounds. The topics seemingly related to the "campaign for peace and against fascism" (favourite clichés of the Communists) were allowed. Nevertheless, pretensed campaign against another adversary, Zionism, restrained the functioning of the Museum nearly to the point of preclusion, regarding research, exhibiting, publishing and cooperation with foreign experts alike.  Curators were not allowed to have contact with Judaica curators abroad. Moreover, activity of the Museum was followed closely by the state organs. However, the concern of the state did not include conditions of the Museum collections and buildings.  Jewish themes were suppressed.

Post 1989

In 1994, in the wake of the 1989 Velvet Revolution, the buildings used by the Museum, as well as the Old Jewish Cemetery, returned to the possession of the Jewish Community of Prague and the Museum's collections were restituted to the Federation of Jewish Communities as the legal successor of the ceased Jewish Communities. In the same year, Leo Pavlát became the director of the successively re-established Jewish Museum in Prague.

In the present 
Currently, administrative activity of the Museum includes:
 The Maisel Synagogue
 The Pinkas Synagogue
 The Spanish Synagogue
 The Klausen Synagogue
 Ceremonial Hall of the Prague Jewish Burial Society
 Old Jewish Cemetery
 Robert Guttmann Gallery
 Archive situated in the Smichov Synagogue
In these buildings of considerable historical value, the Museum lets its visitors explore the actual as well as the spiritual history of the Czech Jews through the exhibition of artefacts from its collection. This is unique among collections of other museums of Jewish heritage, as it comprises the whole area of the Czech lands. The singular collection was not harmed even during the floods in 2002, although some buildings, especially the Pinkas Synagogue, suffered significant damage.

In February 2014 a new Information and Reservation Centre was opened.

Judaica Bohemiae
Since 1965, the museum has published the biannual academic journal Judaica Bohemiae, dedicated to the study of Jewish history and culture in Bohemia, Moravia, and other countries of the former Habsburg Monarchy from the Middle Ages to the present. It is printed in German and English.

Exhibitions
In 1983 part of the museum's collection went on a four-year tour of Canada and the United States as a special exhibition, The Precious Legacy.

Books

 The Jewish Museum of Prague: A Guide Through the Collections,  Hana Volavková, Umělecká beseda, 1948
 Jewish Art Treasures from Prague: The State Jewish Museum in Prague and Its Collections : a Catalogue, Charles Reginald Dodwell, Whitworth Art Gallery, 1920
 The Precious Legacy: Judaic Treasures from the Czechoslovak State Collections, David Altschuler, Vivian Mann, Simon & Schuster 1983
 Magda Veselská: Archa paměti: Cesta pražského židovského muzea pohnutým 20. stoletím [The Memory Ark: The Path of the Prague Jewish Museum through the Eventful 20th Century], Academia: Prague, 2013,

Notable people
 

Leo Pavlát (born 1950), museum director

See also
History of the Jews in Prague

References

External links

Official website (English version)
The Jewish Community of Prague
The Old-New Synagogue
 Jewish Museum in Prague at Google Cultural Institute

Jewish museums in the Czech Republic
Jews and Judaism in Prague
Museums in Prague
History museums in the Czech Republic
1906 establishments in Austria-Hungary
20th-century establishments in Bohemia
Museums established in 1906
20th-century religious buildings and structures in the Czech Republic